Pacific Barreleye Fish (Macropinna) is a genus of ray-finned fish belonging to Opisthoproctidae, the barreleye family. It contains one species, M. microstoma. It is recognized for a highly unusual transparent, fluid-filled shield on its head, through which the lenses of its eyes can be seen. It was originally believed that the tubular eyes of this fish were fixed in place and, therefore, only provided a tunnel vision view of what was seen above its head. However, in 2008, scientists discovered that its eyes were able to rotate both up and forward in its transparent shield. M. microstoma has a tiny mouth and most of its body is covered with large scales. In the low light conditions it is assumed the fish detects prey by its silhouette. MBARI researchers Bruce Robison and Kim Reisenbichler observed that when prey such as small fish and jellyfish are spotted, the eyes rotate like binoculars, facing forward as it turns its body from a horizontal to a vertical position to feed. Robison speculates that M. microstoma steals food from siphonophores.

Introduction 
Macropinna microstoma was discovered in 1939 by marine biologist W. M. Chapman, in deep temperate waters off of the Pacific, Indian, and Atlantic oceans. It is restricted to deep oceanic water by its light-sensitive tubular eyes. The eyes are capped with bright green lenses, and surrounded by a fluid-filled shield. The presence of this fish was mostly unknown until 2004.

Environment 
M. microstoma is a deep-sea fish, living around 1015 meters below the water surface. It is found mostly off of California's coast and the North Pacific ocean. Living in such deep, dark waters results in the light sensitivity M. microstoma experiences. Because of this, the barreleye has upwards ocular viewing. To be able to see prey the barreleye looks upwards towards the surface light.

It has a large, dome-shaped, transparent head. This protects its sensitive eyes from the nematocysts (stinging cells) of the siphonophores, from which it is believed to steal food. Through the dome, the entire inner part of the head can be seen, that is, their eyes, brain and all the nerve endings that make up their head. At first glance it seems that its eyes are at the front of their head in the form of two black holes; these are its olfactory organs. Marine biologists used to believe that the barreleye's eyes were fixed in its head, which would only allow it to look upward. Its large, flat fins allow it to remain nearly motionless in the water, and to maneuver very precisely. Most of the time, the fish hangs motionless in the water, with its body in a horizontal position and its eyes looking upward. The green pigments in its eyes may filter out sunlight coming directly from the sea surface, helping the barreleye spot the bioluminescent glow of jellyfish or other animals directly overhead.

Diet 
M. microstoma shares its deep-sea environment with many different types of cnidarians. Some of the most common are siphonophores (which can reach length of 30 feet). The barreleye has a strong digestive system and it usually feeds on cnidarians and small drifting animals. The small marine creatures trapped on the tentacles of the cnidarians are also targeted by the barreleye fish.

Reproduction 
M. microstoma is thought to be a pelagic spawner (the eggs are coated with a layer of oil that allows them to float on the closest surface of the sea until they hatch). The female lays eggs in water and male releases sperms in water. After hatching, the larvae begin to descend to the depths as they grow, feeding on zooplankton and other small particles of organic material. It is believed that there is no sexual dimorphism between the male and the female and that they do not care for their young.

M. microstoma has been known to science since 1939, but is not known to have been photographed alive until 2004. Old drawings do not show the transparent dome, as it is usually destroyed when brought up from the depths. It is broadly distributed across the northern Pacific Ocean, from the Bering Sea to Japan and Baja California.

References

Further reading

External links 
Photos (archived from the original)
MBARI Article with ROV Video footage
ROV Video footage from above article

Opisthoproctidae
Monotypic fish genera
Fish of the North Pacific
Fish described in 1939